The National Endowment for the Humanities (NEH) is an independent federal agency of the U.S. government, established by the National Foundation on the Arts and the Humanities Act of 1965, dedicated to supporting research, education, preservation, and public programs in the humanities. The NEH is housed at 400 7th St SW, Washington, D.C. From 1979 to 2014, NEH was at 1100 Pennsylvania Avenue, N.W., Washington, D.C. in the Nancy Hanks Center at the Old Post Office.

History and purpose
The NEH provides grants for high-quality humanities projects to cultural institutions such as museums, archives, libraries, colleges, universities, public television, and radio stations, and to individual scholars.  According to its mission statement: "Because democracy demands wisdom, NEH serves and strengthens our republic by promoting excellence in the humanities and conveying the lessons of history to all Americans."

The NEH was created in 1965 as a sub-agency of the National Foundation on the Arts and the Humanities, which today also includes the National Endowment for the Arts, the Institute of Museum and Library Services, and the Federal Council on the Arts and the Humanities. NEH was based upon recommendation of the National Commission on the Humanities, convened in 1963 with representatives from three US scholarly and educational associations, the Phi Beta Kappa Society, the American Council of Learned Societies (ACLS), and the Council of Graduate Schools.

The agencies stated purpose is to create incentives for excellent work in the humanities by: awarding grants that strengthen teaching and learning in the humanities in schools and colleges
 facilitate research and original scholarship
 provide opportunities for lifelong learning
 preserve and provide access to cultural and educational resources
 strengthen the institutional base of the humanities. As part of its mandate to support humanities programs in every US state and territory, the agency supports a network of private, nonprofit affiliates, the 56 humanities councils in the states and territories of the United States.

Jim Leach leadership, 2009–2013
The ninth NEH chair was Jim Leach. President Obama nominated the former Iowa congressman, a Republican, to chair the NEH on June 3, 2009; the Senate confirmed his appointment in August 2009. Leach began his term as the NEH chair on August 12, 2009 and stepped down in May 2013. Between November 2009 and May 2011, Leach conducted the American "Civility Tour" to call attention to the need to restore reason and civility back into politics, a goal that in his words was "central to the humanities." Leach visited each of the 50 states, speaking at venues ranging from university and museum lecture halls to hospitals for veterans, to support the return of non-emotive, civil exchange and rational consideration of other viewpoints. According to Leach, "Little is more important...than establishing an ethos of thoughtfulness and decency of expression in the public square. Words reflect emotion as well as meaning. They clarify—or cloud—thought and energize action, sometimes bringing out the better angels in our nature, sometimes lesser instincts."

William Adams leadership, 2014–2017
The tenth chair of the NEH was William Adams, who served from 2014 to 2017. President Obama nominated Adams on April 4, 2014; Adams was confirmed by the Senate in a voice vote on July 9, 2014. Adams appointed Margaret (Peggy) Plympton as the deputy NEH chair in January 2015.

Before Adams's appointment, the NEH was headed by Acting Chair Carole M. Watson. Adams resigned his appointment on May 23, 2017, when he cited accomplishments under the "Common Good" initiative and the appointment of new administration officials.

Jon Parish Peede, 2018–2022
Appointed under Donald Trump, from 2018 to 2022, Jon Parrish Peede served as Chair of the NEH. On February 10, 2020, the NEH was presented by the Trump administration with a FY2021 budget that included an orderly wind-down of the agency.

Shelly Lowe
Plans to close the agency were halted under the Biden Administration and the NEH continues to operate and provides funding for various projects. In 2022, Shelly Lowe was confirmed as the chairman of the NEH. She is the first Native American to lead the agency. Congress appropriated $180 million USD for the NEH in FY2022, and $207 million USD in 2023.

Offices and initiatives
The Endowment is directed by the NEH chair. Advising the chair is the National Council on the Humanities, a board of 26 distinguished private citizens who are appointed by the president and confirmed by the Senate. The National Council members serve staggered six-year terms.

The NEH chair
The Endowment is directed by a chair, who has legal authority to approve all recommendations and award grants and cooperative agreements. The chair is nominated by the president and confirmed with the advice and consent of the U.S. Senate. The chair's decisions are informed by recommendations from the National Council on the Humanities, peer-reviewers who are selected to read each project proposal submitted to the Endowment, as well as by the Endowment's staff.

Major program offices
The NEH has six grant-making divisions and offices:

 The Division of Preservation and Access awards grants to preserve, maintain, and improve access to primary sources in the humanities, in both digital and analog form.
 The Division of Public Programs supports projects that bring the humanities to large audiences through libraries and museums, television and radio, historic sites, and digital media.
 The Division of Research makes awards to support the publication of books in and outside the humanities.
 The Division of Education works to support and strengthen teaching of the humanities.
 The Office of Federal/State Partnership collaborates with 56 state and territory humanities councils to strengthen local programs.
 The Office of Digital Humanities advises on use of technology in the humanities and coordinates, and was established in 2008.

The Office of Challenge Grants, dissolved in 2017, administered grants intended to support capacity building and encourage fundraising in humanities institutions. The Division of Preservation and Access now offers a grant program that is similar to previous programs in the Challenge Grants office.

Special initiatives
These are special priorities of the endowment that indicate critical areas of the humanities as identified by the NEH chair. They differ from the divisions of the endowment in that they do not sponsor or coordinate specific grant programs.

Bridging Cultures initiative
Bridging Cultures was an NEH initiative that explored ways the humanities promote understanding and mutual respect for people with diverse histories, cultures, and perspectives. Projects supported through this initiative focused on cultures globally as well as within the United States.

Standing Together
This initiative, launched in 2014, marks a priority to make awards that promote understanding of the military experience and to support returning veterans.

We the People
We the People was an NEH special funding stream initiated by NEH chair Coles, using dedicated funds available to each chair of the NEH, which was designed to encourage and enhance the teaching, study, and understanding of American history, culture, and democratic principles. The initiative supports projects and programs that explore significant events and themes in American nation's history, which advance knowledge of the principles that define America.

According to NEH, the initiative led a renaissance in knowledge about American history and principles among all US citizens. The initiative was launched on Constitution Day, September 17, 2002 and active through 2009.

Notable projects
Since 1965, the NEH has sponsored many projects, including:
 "Treasures of Tutankhamen," an exhibition seen by more than 1.5 million people.
 The Civil War, a 1990 documentary by Ken Burns seen by 38 million Americans.
 Library of America, editions of novels, essays, and poems celebrating America's literary heritage.
 United States Newspaper Project, an effort that cataloged and microfilmed 63.3 million pages of newspapers dating from the early United States. The program now digitizes newspapers and makes them available through Chronicling America, a web resource maintained by the Library of Congress.
 Fifteen Pulitzer Prize–winning books, including those by James M. McPherson, Louis Menand, Joan D. Hedrick, and Bernard Bailyn.
 EDSITEment, a Web project bringing the "best of the humanities on the web" to teachers and students, started in 1997.
 Reference archives, in Athens and Boston, of archaeological photographs taken by Eleanor Emlen Myers.
 The Valley of the Shadow, a digital history project created by Edward L. Ayers and William G. Thomas III on the experience of Confederate Civil War soldiers in the United States.
 What's on the Menu, digitization and community-sourced transcription of New York Public Library's restaurant menu collection.
Katherine Anne Porter at 100, a conference at the University of Maryland featuring presentations on Porter and her work, film screenings, and exhibits containing items from Porter's papers.

Recent and upcoming council meetings
Agendas and minutes:
 Agenda for Meeting of the National Council on the Humanities 7 March 2022

Awards

Jefferson Lecture

Since 1972 the NEH has sponsored the Jefferson Lecture in the Humanities, which it describes as "the highest honor the federal government confers for distinguished intellectual achievement in the humanities." The Jefferson Lecturer is selected each year by the National Council on the Humanities. The honoree delivers a lecture in Washington, D.C., during the spring, and receives an honorarium of $10,000. The stated purpose of the honor is to recognize "an individual who has made significant scholarly contributions in the humanities and who has the ability to communicate the knowledge and wisdom of the humanities in a broadly appealing way."

National Humanities Medal and Charles Frankel Prize

The National Humanities Medal, inaugurated in 1997, honors individuals or groups whose work has deepened the nation's understanding of the humanities, broadened citizens' engagement with the humanities, or helped preserve and expand Americans' access to important resources in the humanities. Up to 12 medals can be awarded each year. From 1989 to 1996 the NEH awarded a similar prize known as the Charles Frankel Prize. The new award, a bronze medallion, was designed by David Macaulay, the 1995 winner of the Frankel Prize. Lists of the winners of the National Humanities Medal and the Frankel Prize are available at the NEH website.

Humanities magazine
Starting in 1969, the NEH published a periodical called Humanities; that original incarnation was discontinued in 1978. In 1980, Humanities magazine was relaunched. It is published six times per year, with one cover article each year dedicated to profiling that year's Jefferson Lecturer. Most of its articles have some connection to NEH activities. The magazine's editor since 2007 has been journalist and author David Skinner. From 1990 until her death in 2007, Humanities was edited by Mary Lou Beatty (who had previously been a high-ranking editor at the Washington Post).

See also

 Chair of the National Endowment for the Humanities
 List of state humanities councils
 Institute of Museum and Library Services
 National Endowment for the Arts
 National Humanities Medal
 National Humanities Medal recipients

References

Further reading
 Jensen, Richard. The Culture Wars, 1965-1995: A Historian's Map" Journal of Social History (Vol. 29, Special Issue: Social History and the American Political Climate: Problems and Strategies (1995)), pp. 17-37 online
 Kammen, Michael. "Culture and the State in America." Journal of American History 83.3 (1996): 791-814. online
 Koch, Cynthia M. "Postscript: The Endowments at Fifty." in Funding Challenges and Successes in Arts Education (IGI Global, 2018) pp. 32-48.
 Miller, Stephen. Excellence and Equity: The National Endowment for the Humanities (UP of Kentucky, 2015).
 Redaelli, Eleonora. "Understanding American cultural policy: the multi-level governance of the arts and humanities." Policy Studies 41.1 (2020): 80-97. online
 Topf, Mel A. "The NEH and the Crisis in the Humanities." College English 37.3 (1975): 229-242. online
 Zainaldin, Jamil. "Public works: NEH, Congress, and the state humanities councils." Public Historian'' 35.1 (2013): 28–50. online

External links

 
 National Foundation on the Arts and the Humanities in the Federal Register
 NEH EDSITEment: The Best of the Humanities on the Web
 GrantSocial: NEH Grant Browser 1970-present

 
Great Society programs
Independent agencies of the United States government
Government agencies established in 1965
Foundations based in the United States
Humanities organizations
National Foundation on the Arts and the Humanities